The ambassador of the United States of America to Malaysia is the head of the United States's diplomatic mission to Malaysia. The position has the rank and status of an Ambassador Extraordinary and Plenipotentiary and is based in the Embassy of the United States, Kuala Lumpur.

List of heads of mission

Ambassadors to Malaysia

 Embassy Kuala Lumpur was established on August 31, 1957, with Wright in charge.

Notes

See also
Malaysia–United States relations

References
United States Department of State: Background notes on Malaysia

External links
 United States Department of State: Chiefs of Mission for Malaysia
 United States Department of State: Malaysia
 United States Embassy in Kuala Lumpur

Malaysia
 
United States